Vanio Kostov (born 7 September 1952) is a Bulgarian former professional footballer who played as a central midfielder and is currently a sports agent.

Kostov was part of the Sporting CP team who won the 1982 Supertaça Cândido de Oliveira.

References

External links
 

1955 births
Living people
Bulgarian footballers
Bulgaria international footballers
Association football midfielders
First Professional Football League (Bulgaria) players
Primeira Liga players
Segunda Divisão players
PFC Slavia Sofia players
Sporting CP footballers
C.F. Os Belenenses players
S.C. Farense players
Expatriate footballers in Portugal
Bulgarian expatriates in Portugal
Sportspeople from Burgas